Ítrabo is a municipality in the province of Granada, Spain. As of 2010 Itrabo had a population of 1,152 inhabitants.

References

External links 
 

Municipalities in the Province of Granada